Troense is a town on the island of Tåsinge in south-central Denmark, in  Svendborg Municipality.

Notable people 

 Elvira Madigan (1867 – July 19, 1889 in Nørreskov) & Sixten Sparre lived for a few days in a guest house in Troense before meeting their deaths in the forest area of Nørreskov

Notes 

Cities and towns in the Region of Southern Denmark
Svendborg Municipality